Dendrobium heterocarpum, commonly known as 尖刀唇石斛 (jian dao chun shi hu), is a species of orchid that is native to the China, Nepal, Bhutan, Assam, the Indian subcontinent and Southeast Asia.

References

External links

heterocarpum
Flora of tropical Asia
Plants described in 1830